Las Tiendas is a small unincorporated ranching community in northwestern Webb County, Texas, United States. The community's name is Spanish for "the shops" or "the tents".

References

Handbook of Texas Online, s.v. "Las Tiendas, Texas" (accessed May 23, 2007)

Unincorporated communities in Texas
Unincorporated communities in Webb County, Texas